The 1974 Dixie 500 was a NASCAR Winston Cup Series race held on July 28, 1974, at Atlanta International Raceway in Hampton, Georgia.

Souvenir programs of this event were $2 USD per copy ($ when adjusted for inflation).

Background
Atlanta International Raceway (now Atlanta Motor Speedway) is one of ten current intermediate track to hold NASCAR races; the others are Charlotte Motor Speedway, Chicagoland Speedway, Darlington Raceway, Homestead Miami Speedway, Kansas Speedway, Kentucky Speedway, Las Vegas Motor Speedway, New Hampshire Motor Speedway, and Texas Motor Speedway. However, at the time, only Charlotte and Darlington were built.

The track's turns are banked at twenty-four degrees, while the front stretch, the location of the finish line, and the back stretch are banked at five.

Race report
There were 36 drivers in this 328-lap race; Dan Daughtry was the last-place finisher due to troubles with his engine on lap 10. Earl Ross, a Canadian NASCAR driver, was the only foreigner on the starting grid. Donnie Allison, Buddy Baker and Richard Petty would dominate the opening laps of this event. This would be the last time that a Winston Cup Atlanta race was run during the summer.

Buddy Baker, David Pearson, and Richard Petty would dominate the final laps of the race. In the end, Richard Petty went on to defeat David Pearson by exactly 21 seconds. 38,000 spectators would see other notable drivers such as Elmo Langley, J.D. McDuffie, James Hylton, Donnie Allison and Bill Champion.

Jimmy Crawford would make his final NASCAR Winston Cup Series start in this race; he finished in 31st place.

Individual winnings ranged from the winner's share of $19,350 ($ when adjusted for inflation) to $875 for the last-place finisher ($ when adjusted for inflation). The total prize purse was $101,295 ($ when adjusted for inflation).

Qualifying

Top 10 finishers

References

Dixie 500
Dixie 500
NASCAR races at Atlanta Motor Speedway
Dixie 500